

The Taylor Glacier is an Antarctic glacier about  long, flowing from the plateau of Victoria Land into the western end of Taylor Valley, north of the Kukri Hills, south of the Asgard Range. The middle part of the glacier is bounded on the north by the Inland Forts and on the south by Beacon Valley.

History 
The glacier was discovered by the British National Antarctic Expedition (1901–04) and at that time thought to be a part of Ferrar Glacier. The Western Journey Party of the British Antarctic Expedition of 1910 determined that the upper and lower portions of what was then known as Ferrar Glacier are apposed, i.e., joined in Siamese-twin fashion north of Knobhead. With this discovery Robert Falcon Scott named the upper portion for Thomas Griffith Taylor, geologist and leader of the Western Journey Party.

Glaciology Research 

The Taylor Glacier has been the focus of a measurement and modeling effort carried out by researchers from the University of California, Berkeley and the University of Texas at Austin.

Like other glaciers in the McMurdo Dry Valleys, Taylor Glacier is “cold-based,” meaning its bottom is frozen to the ground below. The rest of the world's glaciers are “wet-based,” meaning they scrape over the bedrock, picking up and leaving obvious piles of debris (moraines) along their edges.

Cold-based glaciers flow more like putty, pushed forward by their own weight. Cold-based glaciers pick up minimal debris, cause little erosion, and leave only small moraines. They also look different from above. Instead of having surfaces full of crevasses, cold-based glaciers are comparatively flat and smooth.

See also
 Blood Falls, an escaping flow of iron oxide-rich ancient ocean water trapped under the Taylor Glacier over a million years ago, containing a unique microbial community.
 List of glaciers
 List of glaciers in the Antarctic
 Tschuffert Peak

References

External links
Pictures from the Taylor Glacier
A Long Term Ecological Research group is working in the Taylor Valley
Satellite images of the region

Glaciers of Victoria Land
McMurdo Dry Valleys